In baseball, throwing a no-hitter is a pitching accomplishment in which one or more pitchers does not yield a hit in the course of one game. A no-hitter is rare in NPB, occurring 66 times since Fumio Fujimura's first cycle during the single league era in 1948. In terms of frequency, the cycle is roughly as common as a no-hitter (101 occurrences in NPB history based on the more recognised international definition, which is not to be confused with the NPB definition, counting combined no-hitters and those where runs were scored by the losing team, which may occur with players advancing on base without hits).

Unlike in Major League Baseball (MLB), combined no-hitters are not considered as official no-hitters by Nippon Professional Baseball.

Nippon Professional Baseball no-hitters

No-hitters with complete game shutout win

Combined no-hitters

No-hitters when the opposing team scores

See also

List of Major League Baseball no-hitters

References
General

Inline citations

Nippon Professional Baseball lists